Thomas Limb (25 February 1850 – 21 February 1901) was an English cricketer  who played for Derbyshire in 1878.

Limb was born Eastwood, Nottinghamshire and became a coal miner. He played in one match for Derbyshire in the 1878 season against Lancashire, in which he failed to score a run, being bowled out by Enoch Storer and Alexander Watson. He was a right-handed batsman and a right-arm round-arm bowler.

Limb died in Eastwood at the age of 50.

References

1850 births
1901 deaths
English cricketers
Derbyshire cricketers